BBX may refer to

BBX (gene), bobby sox homolog, a human gene
BBX-OS, a former proposed name for RIM's Blackberry 10 OS
Berrys' Broking Exchange, an online trading platform operated by Berry Brothers and Rudd
Scion bbX, a concept car
Wings Field (IATA code BBX), a general aviation airport in Blue Bell, Pennsylvania

See also
 BB10 (disambiguation)